Dolichopus picipes  is a species of fly in the family Dolichopodidae. It is found in the  Palearctic .

References

External links
Images representing Dolichopus at BOLD

picipes
Insects described in 1824
Asilomorph flies of Europe
Taxa named by Johann Wilhelm Meigen